The 1962 Indian vice presidential election was held in 7 May 1962 to elect Vice-President of India. Zakir Husain was elected for the post. This was the first contested election for Vice Presidency in India, as the first two elections were uncontested, with Sarvepalli Radhakrishnan being the only candidate. He won against N. C. Samantsinhar by a landslide.

Results

|- align=center
!style="background-color:#E9E9E9" align=center|Candidate
!style="background-color:#E9E9E9" |Electoral Votes
!style="background-color:#E9E9E9" |% of Votes
|-
|align="left"|Zakir Husain||568||97.59
|-
|align="left"|N. C. Samantsinhar||14||2.41
|-
| colspan="3" style="background:#e9e9e9;"|
|-
! style="text-align:left;"| Total
! style="text-align:right;"|582
! style="text-align:right;"|100.00
|-
| colspan="4" style="background:#e9e9e9;"| 
|-
|-
|style="text-align:left;"|Valid Votes||582||97.65
|-
|style="text-align:left;"|Invalid Votes||14||2.35
|-
|style="text-align:left;"|Turnout||596||80.00
|-
|style="text-align:left;"|Abstentions||149||20.00
|-
|style="text-align:left;"|Electors||745|| style="background:#e9e9e9;"|
|-
|}

See also
 1962 Indian presidential election

References

External links

Vice-presidential elections in India
India